Hussein Saddik (born 5 April 1939) is an Egyptian boxer. He competed in the men's welterweight event at the 1964 Summer Olympics.

References

1939 births
Living people
Egyptian male boxers
Olympic boxers of Egypt
Boxers at the 1964 Summer Olympics
Place of birth missing (living people)
Welterweight boxers
20th-century Egyptian people